Dorong is a body of fresh water in the Bauntovsky District, Buryatia, Russia. The name originated in an Evenki word.  

Dorong is a natural monument of Russia because of its landscapes. The valley of the lake acts as a corridor and is usually very windy.

Geography
The lake is located at the southwestern corner of the Southern Muya Range, near where it merges with the Ikat Range. It is a deep and elongated lake, bound by steep mountains on both sides. The Tocha river, belonging to the Tsipa basin, enters the lake from the north and flows out of it from the south.

Fauna
Whitefish species are common in the waters of the lake.

See also
List of lakes of Russia

References

External links

Бурятия. Озеро Доронг.
Экспедиция на оз. Доронг. Серия 5
Geography of tourism in the Republic of Buryatia
Dorong
ceb:Ozero Dorong